Struan George (born 2 May 1978) is a New Zealand cricketer. He played in six first-class matches for Canterbury in 2011 and 2012.

See also
 List of Canterbury representative cricketers

References

External links
 

1978 births
Living people
New Zealand cricketers
Canterbury cricketers
Cricketers from Timaru